The Fortnight for Freedom is a campaign initiated by the Roman Catholic bishops of the United States. Events over the course of fourteen days from June 21 to July 4 each year, call upon Catholics to participate in a pledge to religious liberty and an appeal for the inclusion of a "conscience clause" for religious institutions and religious faithful to practice according to the moral tenets of one's religious faith.

Background
A September 20, 2011, letter from New York Roman Catholic Archbishop Timothy Dolan, which included a three-page analysis by the U.S. Conference of Catholic Bishops, noted the decision of the U.S. Department of Justice (DOJ) from defending the Defense of Marriage Act (DOMA) "to actively attacking DOMA's constitutionality". Dolan predicted such actions on the part of the federal government would "precipitate a national conflict between church and state of enormous proportions and to the detriment of both institutions." In a speech to the American bishops during their visit to Rome on January 19, 2012, Pope Benedict XVI  highlighted the need for the American government to respect the religious "freedom of worship" and "freedom of conscience" amidst "radical secularism".

The bishops formed an ad hoc committee on religious freedom that issued a proclamation on April 12, 2012, setting out their themes for two weeks of events and services in defense of religious liberty which they said was "under attack, both at home and abroad." It presented the issue as non-partisan: "The Constitution is not for Democrats or Republicans or Independents. It is for all of us, and a great nonpartisan effort should be led by our elected representatives to ensure that it remains so." According to the New York Times, the Fortnight campaign came in the context of an extended effort on the part of the bishops to make religious freedom an issue of public debate, an effort that "has not yet galvanized the Catholic laity and has even further polarized the church's liberal and conservative flanks." As infringements on religious liberty the document cited state statutes that prevented Catholic agencies from serving the immigrant population and denial of funds to Catholic agencies such as adoption agencies because they do not comply with government policy with respect to adoption by same-sex couples.

Bishop Thomas J. Paprocki of Springfield, Illinois, proposed the name Fortnight for Freedom and the scheduled designed to celebrate the feast days of saints who died for their faith, including Thomas More. On the eve of the campaign, Archbishop William E. Lori of Baltimore, chairman of the ad hoc committee, acknowledged that the effort was viewed by many as partisan and exaggerated and had been criticized by some Catholics. He commented: "It is not about parties, candidates or elections, as some others have suggested.... In the face of this resistance, it may be tempting to get discouraged, to second-guess the effort, to soft-pedal our message. But instead, these things should prompt us to do exactly the opposite, for they show us how very great is the need for our teaching, both in our culture and even in our own church."

The American Bishops initiated the campaign due to a perceived attack on personal and public religious liberty. They cited the health benefits regulations established by the U.S. Department of Health and Human Services under the Affordable Health Care for America Act, that requires employers that provide health care insurance for their employees, including religious and charitable organizations and religiously affiliated hospitals and universities, to include coverage for contraception, sterilization, and other forms of birth control.

Purposes
The Bishops sought guarantees that would shield them from lawsuits if they refused to make their facilities available on a commercial basis to people or for events, such as the celebration of same-sex marriages, to which the Roman Catholic Church has moral objections.

With respect to government attempts to distinguish religious activity from enterprises in which a religious organization is engaged, proponents of the event maintained that religious liberty is a right afforded them by the U.S. Constitution. They reject the idea that the American government can determine which of their activities should be identified as a religious in nature and therefore protected by the guarantee of religious liberty and which of their activities is not.

Despite the bishops' attempt to demonstrate that a series of challenges to religious liberty motivated them, press coverage and public discussion focused on the health benefits controversy. As the Baltimore Sun described the Fortnight campaign at its launch: "The campaign focuses on a policy requiring religious institutions to offer birth control and other reproductive health care in employee health plans." Its only quotation from Archbishsop Lori's remarks prepared for the Mass that inaugurated the campaign underscored that focus: "On Aug. 1, less than six weeks from now, the Health and Human Services mandate will go into effect. This will force conscientious private employers to violate their consciences by funding and facilitating through their employee health insurance plans reproductive 'services' that are morally objectionable." The Los Angeles Times set the campaign in the context of the Vatican's censure of U.S. nuns and the priest sex-abuse scandal. It noted some of the bishop's rhetoric–Dolan said the White House was "strangling" the Church–and the healthcare-related lawsuit against the federal government. It quoted a Colgate University political scientist on the bishops traditional bi-partisanship: "I think it's without doubt that they are in the process of squandering that special position or role in American politics. The danger is that they'll be seen as social conservatives in league with a political party whose views on economic issues are not ones that the bishops share.... That doesn't strike me as a particularly good way of protecting the long-term viability of the church as a participant in American policy debates."

Events
The campaign began with a Mass at the Baltimore Basilica, chosen because Baltimore is the oldest diocese in the United States. It ended with a Mass held at the National Shrine of the Immaculate Conception in Washington, D.C., on July 4, 2012, the Independence Day holiday.

More than 70 of the 195 dioceses in the U.S. scheduled events. A flier distributed to parishes during the Fortnight campaign included "New York City's push to prevent congregations from holding prayer services in public schools; some states’ termination of contracts with Catholic Charities because the organization will not place adoptive children with same-sex couples; and Catholic organizations’ losing contracts to fight human trafficking because they will not refer victims for abortions or contraception."

Criticism and debate
Writing in the National Catholic Reporter, John L. Allen contrasted the rhetoric of the Fortnight for Freedom, which described a "war on religion" in America, with countries where religious advocates are "threatened, beaten, imprisoned and even murdered." The head of Catholics for Equality, an LGBT rights group, called the campaign "election-year political posturing.... It all has to do with their bigger push to be politically powerful again." The head of Catholics United, a social service advocacy organization, protested outside the Baltimore Mass that launched the campaign. He commented: "We love the church, but we hate the politics. We think that the decision to have a 'Fortnight for Freedom' really is a political attack on President Obama, and it doesn't reflect the moral priorities of Catholics sitting in the pews, who are really more concerned about bread-and-butter issues." A leader of a liberal Catholic group, Faith in Public Life, said: "I think some of the alarmist rhetoric that some church leaders are using gives the impression that some bishops are quite happy making this part of a Republican campaign." He feared the bishops would be seen as "the Republican Party at prayer", a reference to the phrase used by Maude Royden, an advocate for women's rights, in 1917: "The Church [of England] should go forward along the path of progress and be no longer satisfied only to represent the Conservative Party at prayer."

After the Fortnight for Freedom was scheduled, a group of U.S. nuns launched a two-week bus tour–Nuns on the Bus–that nearly coincided with the dates of the Fortnight for Freedom. Some American nuns had demonstrated their independence from the bishops by supporting the Obama administration's health care initiatives and been sharply criticized by the Vatican.

References

External links
Official site

Catholic Church in the United States
Separation of church and state in the United States
Freedom of religion in the United States
2012 in American politics